Mary Jane Marcasiano (born September 23, 1955) is an American fashion and costume designer, film producer, and social entrepreneur.

Early life and education
Marcasiano was born in East Hanover Township, New Jersey and later attended Hanover Park High School, but left a year early to attend Montclair State University. After two years at the university, she left Montclair to attend Parsons The New School for Design. While still in art school, Marcasiano studied weaving, and she started selling handwoven handbags, scarves, and accessories in New York.

In 2019, Marcasiano obtained her Master's Degree from New York University Gallatin with a thesis concerned with the intersection of art, nonprofits, and social change. IN 2022, she received a certificate in diversity, equity and inclusion from Cornell University.

Career 
While attending Parsons, Marcasiano moved to the Soho area of Manhattan, a neighborhood that played an important role in her creative development and business approach. Recognized as one of the young downtown emerging designers, she showed her first collection in 1979 at the Susan Caldwell Gallery in SoHo. In the early ‘80s Marcasiano became a member of the Council of Fashion Designers of America and was the awarded the Cartier, DuPont, Cutty Sark and Wool Knit Awards.

Costume designer
In 2021, Marcasiano was the costume designer for Bruno Barreto in the 2021 HBO mini-series The American Guest, starring Aidan Quinn and Dana Delany. She was also the costume designer for the 2022 musical theater Yemandja starring Angélique Kidjo.

Creative aesthetic 
Marcasiano's design philosophy comes from a desire for comfort in her knitwear by using simple shapes. She would like her designs to be worn from morning to evening, in warm to cold weather, from sexy to serious. This comfort is achieved by combining Lycra-blend stretch fabrics into more traditional knitwear. The color was chosen and matched for the type of yarn to enhance the impact of the color.

Brazil and Africa currently inspire Marcasiano, the countries she works with, on her Made With Love Project. “I work in a lot of mediums these days,” says Marcasiano, “But the common thread for me is Brazil, a country and people which continually inspire me.”

Company 
Marcasiano formed her eponymous company in 1979 with her first womenswear collection and introduced a menswear line in 1980. In 1985 she licensed her name to shoes, furs, and jewelry produced in Italy.

Marcasiano's business was purchased by Hampshire Designs in 1995 and was later acquired by Marisa Christina in 1998.

Marcasiano's designs have been sold in boutique, specialty and department stores around the globe  and featured in Vogue, Harpers Bazaar and other fashion magazines.

Involvement in the arts 
Marcasiano has designed costumes for DanceBrazil, the New York City Ballet, RythMEK at Jacob’s Pillow, Cleo Parker Robinson Dance, Michael Thomas Lab, and for the short film “ Até Quando“. In 2009 Marcasiano collaborated with renowned artist Eric Fischl on costumes for his suite of sculptures titled “ Ten Breaths “ which was exhibited in Germany, Paris and New York. Marcasiano designed the costumes for the 2010/2011 world tour of Grammy award-winning singer Angelique Kidjo and was costume designer for the PBS Special "Angelique Kidjo and Friends: Spirit Rising". In 2013 Marcasiano designed costumes for the feature film “Reaching for the Moon” directed by Bruno Barreto.

In 2002, Marcasiano produced “Ginga”, a documentary film about Capoeira directed by Gustavo Moraes. She currently serves as Director of Development and Special Events Advisor to Cinema Tropical, a non-profit foundation that distributes and promotes Latin American cinema in the United States. She was the programmer for Cinema Tropical’s Music+Film series at 92YTribeca and directed their Brazilian film initiative Janeiro in New York.

Social entrepreneurship
In 2007 Marcasiano created the Made With Love Project, a non-profit global initiative dedicated to raising funds and awareness for NGOs aiding women and children in need. The project is supported through the production and sale of products that provide a fair income for women in Brazil, Africa and Haiti. Made With Love does their works through the Cygnet Foundation, a 501(c)(3) non-for-profit public foundation.

Marcasiano also works with women's co-operatives in developing countries, particularly in Africa and South America, facilitating the sale and distribution of the products to a global market through web sales and strategic marketing alliances. The Made With Love Project directs the net proceeds from selling those products to relevant children's charities in the region of the product’s origination.

Exhibitions and permanent collections 
 All American: A Sportswear Tradition, Fashion Institute of Technology, 1985.

Filmography 
 Reaching for the Moon (2013) – Associate Producer
 Ginga – A Capoeira Documentary (2004) – Producer 
 Angelique Kidjo & Friends: Spirit Rising (2011) – Costume Designer 
 Até Quando (2007) – Costume Designer

Personal life 
Marcasiano lives in New York with her husband, photographer Ralph Gibson.

References

External links 
 Marcasiano's Official Website
 

1955 births
American fashion designers
American women fashion designers
Hanover Park High School alumni
Living people
Montclair State University alumni
Parsons School of Design alumni
People from East Hanover, New Jersey
People from SoHo, Manhattan